Matthew 8:7 is the seventh verse of the eighth chapter of the Gospel of Matthew in the New Testament. This verse continues the miracle story of healing the centurion's servant, the second of a series of miracles in Matthew.

Content
In the original Greek according to Westcott-Hort this verse is:
 λεγει αυτω εγω ελθων θεραπευσω αυτον

In the King James Version of the Bible the text reads:
 And Jesus saith unto him, I will come and heal him.

The English Standard Version translates the passage as:
 And he said to him, “I will come and heal him.”

The New International Version translates the passage as:
 Jesus said to him, “Shall I come and heal him?”

For a collection of other versions see BibleHub Matthew 8:7.

Analysis
In the previous verse a Centurion had asked Jesus to come heal this paralyzed servant. Modern translations have two very different version of this verse. Some like the ESV translate it as a declaration that Jesus will go and heal the servant. Others like the NIV have Jesus questioning if he should come help.

The original Greek is ambiguous and both versions can work with the narrative. Jesus responding with an initial question parallels his response to the Canaanite woman in Matthew 15. Initially gentiles are met with rejection, and most prove their piety before Jesus will acknowledge them. Jesus' initial reluctance may also be attached to prohibitions against entering the home of a gentile. Gundry argues that if entering the home was the issue, the focus would be on that not on the healing.

Commentary from the Church Fathers
Jerome: The Lord seeing the centurion's faith, humbleness, and thoughtfulness, straightway promises to go and heal him; Jesus saith unto him, I will come and heal him.

Chrysostom: Jesus here does what He never did; He always follows the wish of the supplicant, but here He goes before it, and not only promises to heal him, but to go to his house. This He does, that we may learn the worthiness of the centurion.

Pseudo-Chrysostom: Had not He said, I will come and heal him, the other would never have answered, I am not worthy. It was because it was a servant for whom he made petition, that Christ promised to go, in order to teach us not to have respect to the great, and overlook the little, but to honour poor and rich alike.

References

08:07